The 2005 Women's EuroHockey Nations Championship was the 7th edition of the women's field hockey championship organised by the European Hockey Federation. It was held from the 14th until the 20th of August 2005 in Dublin, Ireland.

Qualified teams

Format
The eight teams were be split into two groups of four teams. The top two teams advanced to the semifinals in order to determine the winner in a knockout system. The bottom two teams played in a new group with the teams they did not play against in the group stage. The last two teams were relegated to the EuroHockey Nations Challenge.

Results
All times were local (UTC+0).

Preliminary round

Pool A

Pool B

Fifth to eighth place classification

Pool C
Points obtained in the preliminary round are carried over into Pool C.

First to fourth place classification

Semifinals

Third and fourth place

Final

Final standings

See also
 2005 Men's EuroHockey Nations Championship
 2005 Women's EuroHockey Nations Trophy

References

Women's EuroHockey Nations Championship
EuroHockey Nations Championship
EuroHockey Nations Championship
International women's field hockey competitions hosted by Ireland
International sports competitions in Dublin (city)
EuroHockey Nations Championship
Women 1